"Pinball Wizard" is a song written by Pete Townshend and performed by the English rock band the Who, featured on their 1969 rock opera album Tommy. The original recording was released as a single in 1969 and reached No. 4 in the UK charts and No. 19 on the U.S. Billboard Hot 100.

The B-side of the "Pinball Wizard" single is an instrumental credited to Keith Moon, titled "Dogs Part Two".  Despite the title, it has no musical connection to the Who's 1968 UK single "Dogs".

Story
The lyrics are written from the perspective of a pinball champion, called "Local Lad" in the Tommy libretto book, astounded by the skills of the opera's eponymous main character, Tommy Walker: "He ain't got no distractions / Can't hear those buzzers and bells / Don't see lights a flashin' / Plays by sense of smell / Always gets a replay / Never seen him fall / That deaf dumb and blind kid / Sure plays a mean pinball.", and "I thought I was the Bally table king, but I just handed my pinball crown to him".

Townshend once called it "the most clumsy piece of writing [he'd] ever done". Nevertheless, the song was a commercial success and remains one of the most recognised tunes from the opera. It was a perpetual concert favourite for Who fans due to its pop sound and familiarity.

Position on the album
In late 1968 or early 1969, when the Who played a rough assembly of their new album to critic Nik Cohn, Cohn gave a lukewarm reaction to it. Following this, Townshend, as Tommys principal composer, discussed the album with Cohn and concluded that, to lighten the load of the rock opera's heavy spiritual overtones (Townshend had recently become deeply interested in the teachings of Meher Baba), the title character, a "deaf, dumb, and blind" boy, should also be particularly good at a certain game. Knowing Cohn was an avid pinball fan, Townshend suggested that Tommy would play pinball, and Cohn immediately declared Tommy to be a masterpiece. The song "Pinball Wizard" was written and recorded almost immediately. The single version was slightly sped up and runs to 2:57, whilst the natural length album version runs to 3:04.

Reception
Billboard described the single as "a solid beat rocker."

Live performances
This song is one of the band's most famous live songs, being played at almost every Who concert since its debut live performance on 2 May 1969. The live performances rarely deviated from the album arrangement, save for an occasional jam at the end sometimes leading to another song. Bootleg recordings show that this song has been known to last as long as 8 minutes (at a concert at the Rainbow Theatre in London on 3 February 1981), although live versions lasting as long as that are extremely rare. Pinball Wizard was also played during the Super Bowl XLIV Halftime Show on 7 February 2010.

Personnel
Roger Daltrey – lead vocals
Pete Townshend – backing vocals, co-lead vocals, acoustic guitar, electric guitar
John Entwistle – bass guitar
Keith Moon – drums

Charts and certifications

Weekly charts

Year-end charts

Certifications

Elton John version

The song was performed by English musician Elton John in Ken Russell's 1975 film adaptation of Tommy. This version was released in 1975 as a promotional single only in the US, and in 1976 in the UK, where it reached number 7. Because it was not released as a commercial single in the US, it was ineligible to be listed on the Billboard Hot 100 chart. It did however make the US Radio & Records airplay chart, where it reached number 9.

John's version uses a piano as the song's centerpiece in place of the acoustic guitar in the original (in the film, John's character is shown playing his pinball machine via a small piano keyboard), and features additional lyrics specially written by Townshend for the movie version, as well as a subtle inclusion of musical phrases from the Who's 1960s hit "I Can't Explain" during the outro (similarly, the Who's later cover of Elton John's "Saturday Night's Alright for Fighting" included parts of "Take Me to the Pilot"). Unlike most of the soundtrack's music, which featured various combinations of the Who and some of the era's best session players, Elton John used his own band and producer Gus Dudgeon for the track. John has performed the song as part of his Las Vegas Red Piano Show, as well as on various tours. To date, it is the only cover of a Who song to reach the top 10.

The song has subsequently been performed by Taron Egerton who portrayed Elton John in the film Rocketman (2019).

Personnel
 Elton John – lead vocals, piano
 Davey Johnstone – acoustic and electric guitars, backing vocals
 Dee Murray – bass, backing vocals
 Nigel Olsson – drums, backing vocals
 Ray Cooper – tambourine, congas

Chart performance
In Toronto, "Pinball Wizard" spent two weeks at number one on the CHUM survey. In Chicago, "Pinball Wizard" remained on the WLS Musicradio Survey as an "extra" for five and a half months, from mid-April to late September as an album track in heavy rotation.

Other cover versions
 The song was featured in a medley with another song from Tommy ("See Me, Feel Me") in a recording by the British pop group the New Seekers in 1973. This version reached No. 16 on the UK charts and in Australia, and No. 28 in Canada, and No. 29 on the U.S. Hot 100. 
 In 1977, Barry Williams performed the song during a "Songs from Movies" medley on an episode of The Brady Bunch Variety Hour.
 McFly released their cover of the song in 2005 as the B-side to their UK number one single "I'll Be OK". They subsequently performed a cover of "My Generation" with Roger Daltrey that was exclusively released on HMV's new HMV Digital download store in September of that year.
 Tenacious D also regularly perform the song as a part of a medley of songs from Tommy
 In 2012, during the third season of Glee, Alex Newell performed the song during national competition.

In popular culture
 The track is featured on the video games Rock Band 2, Rock Band Unplugged and Karaoke Revolution: American Idol Encore 2, as well as on The Who's Tommy Pinball Wizard.
 Bruce Springsteen makes a reference to the song in his song "4th of July, Asbury Park (Sandy)", in the album The Wild, the Innocent, & the E Street Shuffle, with the lyric "And the wizards play down on Pinball Way".

References

External links
 
 

1969 singles
1975 singles
1976 singles
The Who songs
Elton John songs
Works about pinball
Songs written by Pete Townshend
Decca Records singles
DJM Records singles
MCA Records singles
Polydor Records singles
Track Records singles
Song recordings produced by Kit Lambert
1969 songs